The Louis d'Or is a Dutch acting award, given annually to the actor with the most impressive leading role of the theater season. It is awarded by the Vereniging van Schouwburg- en Concertgebouwdirecties (VSCD), the main trade organisation for theaters in The Netherlands. The award itself is a golden medal, currently designed by Eric Claus. It was named after the Dutch actor Louis Bouwmeester. Its female counterpart is the Theo d'Or.

The Louis d'Or is awarded annually, along with the other VSCD stage awards, at the Gala of Dutch Theater in the Stadsschouwburg in Amsterdam.

Jury
The jury is compiled of theater programmers, producers and critics, who have explicitly provided themselves in their relative disciplines. Jurors can take part of a jury for maximal six years. New jurors can be nominated by the jury itself or be appointed by the board of the VSCD.

Award winners

 

 1955: Paul Steenbergen
 1956: Han Bentz van den Berg
 1957: Ko van Dijk
 1958: Han Bentz van den Berg
 1959: Paul Steenbergen
 1960: Paul Steenbergen
 1961: Bob de Lange
 1962: not awarded
 1963: Guus Hermus
 1964: Han Bentz van den Berg
 1965: Paul Steenbergen
 1966: not awarded
 1967: Eric Schneider
 1968: Ton Lutz
 1969: Hans Tiemeyer
 1970: Henk van Ulsen
 1971: Wim van der Grijn en Hans Dagelet
 1972: Guido de Moor
 1973: André van den Heuvel
 1974: Siem Vroom
 1975: Peter Faber on behalf of the Werkteater
 1976: Peter van der Linden
 1977: Carol Linssen
 1978: Eric van der Donk
 1979: Jules Croiset
 1980: Hans Croiset
 1981: Gees Linnebank
 1982: Joop Admiraal
 1983: Ton Lutz
 1984: John Kraaijkamp sr.
 1985: Siem Vroom
 1986: Guido de Moor
 1987: Guido de Moor
 1988: Carol van Herwijnen
 1989: Guido de Moor
 1990: Peter Oosthoek
 1991: Peter Faber
 1992: André van den Heuvel
 1993: Gijs Scholten van Aschat
 1994: Pierre Bokma
 1995: Warre Borgmans
 1996: Victor Löw
 1997: Herman Gilis
 1998: Peter De Graef
 1999: Lucas Van den Eynde
 2000: Bram van der Vlugt
 2001: Steven Van Watermeulen
 2002: Edwin de Vries
 2003: Bert Luppes
 2004: Jeroen Willems
 2005: Mark Rietman
 2006: Joop Keesmaat
 2007: Dirk Roofthooft
 2008: Hans Kesting
 2009: Bert Luppes
 2010: Kees Hulst
 2011: Jacob Derwig
 2012: Hein van der Heijden
 2013: Pierre Bokma
 2014: Jacob Derwig
 2015: Ramsey Nasr
 2016: Hans Kesting
 2017: Hans Croiset
 2018: Bruno Vanden Broecke
 2019: Ramsy Nasr
 2020: not awarded
 2021: Emmanuel Ohene Boafo
 2022: Bram Suijker

References

External links
 Homepage of the VSCD stage awards
 Wiki Theaterencyclopedie

Awards established in 1955
Dutch awards
Theatre acting awards
1955 establishments in the Netherlands